ETEM is a leading producer of aluminium profiles and architectural systems in Greece. It is one of the leading aluminium extrusion companies in south eastern Europe. Founded in 1971, ETEM S.A. is the first fully integrated designer and producer of architectural systems and aluminium profiles for industrial applications in Greece.
  
With two production facilities, in Greece and Bulgaria, and an annual capacity that exceeds 40.000 tons/year, ETEM guarantees continuous and uninterrupted delivery to its customers. Through continuous innovation and investments in infrastructure equipment and people, ETEM is an international company with exports that exceed 70% of its production capacity and presence in more than 20 countries.
 
Aluminium companies of Greece
Manufacturing companies based in Athens
Greek brands